The Philippines has a comprehensive banking system encompassing various types of banks, from large universal banks to small rural banks and even non-banks. As of September 30, 2022, there were forty-five (45) universal and commercial banks, forty-four (44) savings banks, four hundred (400) rural and cooperative banks, forty (40) credit unions and 6,267 non-banks with quasi-banking functions, all licensed by the Bangko Sentral ng Pilipinas (Central Bank of the Philippines) under the General Banking Act of 2000.

On top of regular banking services offered by universal, commercial, thrift and rural banks, there are savings and loan associations which are mainly based in communities and among retirees in the armed forces and the police organization and other employees of the government of the Philippines. Prominent among these small savings services is the Armed Forces and Police Savings and Loan Association, Inc. (AFPSLAI), which is exclusive to active servicemen and retirees of the armed forces in the Philippines.

List

Universal and commercial banks

The forty-five banks listed above are those with the biggest assets in the Philippine banking industry, listed at the BSP website as of September 30, 2022. The largest of these is BDO Unibank and the smallest is Al-Amanah Islamic Bank.

Source: Bangko Sentral ng Pilipinas

Savings banks

These are the forty-four (44) savings and thrift banks in the Philippines as of September 30, 2022, listed in the official website of the Bangko Sentral ng Pilipinas (BSP).

Rural and cooperative banks

The rural and cooperative banks listed above are the updated list from the official website of the Bangko Sentral ng Pilipinas (BSP) as of September 30, 2022. The largest rural bank in the Philippines in terms of assets is BDO Network Bank.

Defunct or merged banks
1st E Bank (Philippine Branches acquired by Banco de Oro)
Acme Savings Bank (acquired by the Sy Group of Companies and renamed Banco De Oro)
AIG Philam Savings Bank (merged with East West Banking Corporation)
Allied Bank (merged with Philippine National Bank)
AMA Rural Bank of Mandaluyong, Inc.
American Express Bank (renamed BDO Elite Savings Bank)
Banco Filipino
Banco Santander Central Hispano (Philippine subsidiary acquired by Banco De Oro and renamed BDO Private Bank)
Bank of Cebu
Capitol Development Bank (acquired by RCBC and became RCBC Savings Bank - merged with RCBC)
Cooperative Bank of Aurora
Dao Heng Bank (acquired by Banco de Oro)
Ecology Bank (merged with Equitable PCI Bank)
Equitable PCI Bank (merged with PCI Bank forming it and now merged with Banco de Oro)
Export and Industry Bank
Family Savings Bank (acquired by BPI; renamed to BPI Family Savings Bank)
Far East Bank And Trust Company (acquired by Bank of the Philippine Islands)
GE Money Bank (acquired by Banco de Oro)
Green Bank of Caraga (acquired by EastWest Banking Corporation alongside FinMan Rural Bank, Inc. in 2013 and became EastWest Rural Bank, Inc.)
Insular Bank of Asia and America (merged with Philippine Commercial International Bank)
International Exchange Bank (acquired by and merged with Union Bank of the Philippines)
Keppel Bank (acquired by GE Capital Finance)
Mindanao Development Bank (merged with Equitable PCI Bank)
Orient Commercial Banking Corporation (forced to close; Allied Bank took over 52 branches)
Philippine Commercial International Bank (merged with Equitable PCI Bank and now merged with Banco De Oro)
Philippine Postal Savings Bank (PostBank; acquired by Landbank in 2018 and became Overseas Filipino Bank)
Philippine Resources Savings Bank (PR Savings Bank; acquired by CitySavings Bank in 2018)
Planters Development Bank (merged with Chinabank Savings)
Standard Chartered Bank Philippines (Philippine retail banking business was acquired by East West Banking Corporation in 2016)
Traders Royal Bank (now emerged with Bank Of Commerce)
United Coconut Planters Bank (merged with Landbank)
United Overseas Bank (66 out of 67 Branches merged with Banco de Oro)
Urban Bank (forced to close then merged with Export and Industry Bank)

Largest banks

References

External links

Philippines
Philippines
 
Banks